Stephanie Dunlea is a camogie player, winner of a Lynchpin award, predecessor of the All Star awards, in 2003 and of All Ireland medals in 2002  and 2005. She was nominated for the All-Star shortlist in 2004.

Family background
Her grand-aunt Kate Dunlea captained Cork to the 1933 title. Her father John won an All-Ireland Junior Football Championship medal in 1964, and her brother Pat nipped a junior football medal in 2001. Her sister Lynn won five All Ireland medals and acted as camogie match analyst on RTÉ's Sunday Sport.

Nominations
After the institution of the official All Stars scheme, she was short-listed for an All-Star in 2004 and 2005.

References

Living people
Year of birth missing (living people)
Cork camogie players